Lake Kivu is one of the African Great Lakes. It lies on the border between the Democratic Republic of the Congo and Rwanda, and is in the Albertine Rift, the western branch of the East African Rift. Lake Kivu empties into the Ruzizi River, which flows southwards into Lake Tanganyika.

Geography
This lake has a chance of suffering a limnic eruption every 1000 years.

Some  or 58 percent of the lake's waters lie within DRC borders.

The lake bed sits upon a rift valley that is slowly being pulled apart, causing volcanic activity in the area.

The world's tenth-largest island in a lake, Idjwi, lies in Lake Kivu,  within the boundaries of Virunga National Park. Settlements on the lake's shore include Bukavu, Kabare, Kalehe, Sake and Goma in the Democratic Republic of the Congo, and Gisenyi, Kibuye, and Cyangugu in Rwanda.

Chemistry
Lake Kivu is a fresh water lake and, along with Cameroonian Lake Nyos and Lake Monoun, is one of three that are known to undergo limnic eruptions. Around the lake, geologists found evidence of massive local extinctions about every thousand years, presumably caused by outgassing events. The trigger for lake overturns in Lake Kivu is unknown, but volcanic activity and changes in climate are both suspected. The gaseous chemical composition of exploding lakes is unique to each lake. In Lake Kivu's case, it includes methane and carbon dioxide, as a result of lake water interaction with volcanic hot springs.

The amount of methane contained at the bottom of the lake is estimated to be . The lake also holds an estimated  of carbon dioxide which, if released in an eruption event, could suffocate all of the inhabitants of the lakeshore. The methane is reported to be produced by microbial reduction of the volcanic . A future overturn and gas release from the deep waters of Lake Kivu would result in catastrophe, dwarfing the historically documented lake overturns at the much smaller Lakes Nyos and Monoun. The lives of the approximately two million people who live in the lake basin area would be threatened.

Cores from the Bukavu Bay area of the lake reveal that the bottom has layered deposits of the rare mineral monohydrocalcite interlaid with diatoms, on top of sapropelic sediments with high pyrite content. These are found at three different intervals. The sapropelic layers are believed to be related to hydrothermal discharge and the diatoms to a bloom which reduced the carbon dioxide levels low enough to precipitiate monohydrocalcite.

Scientists hypothesise that sufficient volcanic interaction with the lake's bottom water that has high gas concentrations would heat water, force the methane out of the water, spark a methane explosion, and trigger a nearly simultaneous release of carbon dioxide. The carbon dioxide would then suffocate large numbers of people in the lake basin as the gases roll off the lake surface. It is also possible that the lake could spawn lake tsunamis as gas explodes out of it.

The risk posed by Lake Kivu began to be understood during the analysis of more recent events at Lake Nyos. Lake Kivu's methane was originally thought to be merely a cheap natural resource for export, and for the generation of cheap power. Once the mechanisms that caused lake overturns began to be understood, so did awareness of the risk the lake posed to the local population.

An experimental vent pipe was installed at Lake Nyos in 2001 to remove gas from the deep water, but such a solution for the much larger Lake Kivu would be considerably more expensive. Therefore, the process of releasing it could potentially have costs beyond simply building and operating the system.

This problem associated with the prevalence of methane is that of mazuku, the Swahili term "evil wind" for the outgassing of methane and carbon dioxide that kills people and animals, and can even kill vegetation when in high enough concentration.

Methane extraction

Until 2004, extraction of the gas was done on a small scale, with the extracted gas being used to run boilers at the Bralirwa brewery in Gisenyi. As far as large-scale exploitation of this resource is concerned, the Rwandan government has negotiated with a number of parties to produce methane from the lake.

In 2011 ContourGlobal, a UK-based energy company focused on emerging markets, secured project financing to initiate a large-scale methane extraction project. The project is run through a local Rwandan entity called KivuWatt, using an offshore barge platform to extract, separate, and clean the gasses obtained from the lake bed before pumping purified methane via an underwater pipeline to on-shore gas engines. Stage one of the project, powering three "gensets" along the lake shore and supplying 26 MW of electricity to the local grid, has since been completed. The next phase aims to deploy nine additional gensets at 75 MW to create a total capacity of 101 MW.

In addition, Symbion Power Lake Kivu Limited was awarded a Concession and Power Producing Agreement (PPA) in 2015, to produce 50 MW of power using Lake Kivu methane.  The project is expected to commence construction in 2019, with first power (Phase 1 - 14 MW) to be produced in first quarter 2020. The plant will be fully operational in 2021.

Symbion Power has purchased another concession for a further 25 MW and are currently negotiating a PPA with the Rwanda Electricity Group which may see 8 MW of power despatched to the Grid six months after the PPA has been signed.  This concession is on the site of the original pilot plant known as KP1.

In addition to managing gas extraction, KivuWatt will also manage the electrical generation plants and on-sell the electrical power to the Rwandan government under the terms of a long-term Power Purchase Agreement (PPA). This allows KivuWatt to control a vertically integrated energy offering from point of extraction to point of sale into the local grid. Extraction is said to be cost-effective and relatively simple because once the gas-rich water is pumped up, the dissolved gases (primarily carbon dioxide, hydrogen sulphide and methane) begin to bubble out as the water pressure gets lower. This project is expected to increase Rwanda's energy generation capability by as much as 20 times, and will enable Rwanda to sell electricity to neighbouring African countries. The firm was awarded the 2011 Africa Power deal of the year for innovation in the financing arrangements it obtained from various sources for the KivuWatt project. The $200 million power plant was operating at 26 MW in 2016.

Biology and fisheries

The fish fauna in Lake Kivu is relatively poor with 28 described species, including four introduced species. The natives are the Lake Rukwa minnow (Raiamas moorii), four species of barb (ripon barbel, Barbus altianalis, East African red-finned barb, Enteromius apleurogramma, redspot barb, E. kerstenii and Pellegrin's barb, E. pellegrini), an Amphilius catfish, two Clarias catfish (C. liocephalus and C. gariepinus), Nile tilapia (Oreochromis niloticus) and 15 endemic Haplochromis cichlids. Another c. 20 possibly undescribed species of cichlids are known from the lake. The introduced species are three cichlids, the longfin tilapia (Oreochromis macrochir), blue-spotted tilapia (O. leucostictus) and redbreast tilapia (Coptodon rendalli), and a clupeid, the Lake Tanganyika sardine (Limnothrissa miodon).

It was introduced to Lake Kivu in late 1959 by a Belgian Engineer A. Collart. At present, Lake Kivu is the sole natural lake in which L. miodon, a sardine originally restricted to Lake Tanganyika, has been introduced initially to fill an empty niche. Prior to the introduction, no planktivorous fish was present in the pelagic waters of Lake Kivu. In the early 1990s, the number of fishers on the lake was 6,563, of which 3,027 were associated with the pelagic fishery and 3,536 with the traditional fishery. The widespread armed conflict in the surrounding region from the mid-1990s resulted in a decline in the fisheries harvest.

Following this introduction, the sardine has gained substantial economic and nutritional importance for the lakeside human population but from an ecosystem standpoint, the introduction of planktivorous fish may result in important modifications of plankton community structure. Recent observations showed the disappearance during the last decades of a large grazer, Daphnia curvirostris, and the dominance of mesozooplankton community by three species of cyclopoid copepod: Thermocyclops consimilis, Mesocyclops aequatorialis and Tropocyclops confinis.

The first comprehensive phytoplankton survey was released in 2006. With an annual average chlorophyll a in the mixed layer of 2.2 mg m−3 and low nutrient levels in the euphotic zone, the lake is clearly oligotrophic. Diatoms are the dominant group in the lake, particularly during the dry season episodes of deep mixing. During the rainy season, the stratified water column, with high light and lower nutrient availability, favour dominance of cyanobacteria with high numbers of phototrophic picoplankton. The actual primary production is 0.71 g C m−2 d−1 (≈ 260 g C m−2 a−1).

A study of evolutionary genetics showed that the cichlids from lakes in northern Virunga (e.g., Edward, George, Victoria) would have evolved in a "proto-lake Kivu", much older than the intense volcanic activity (20,000-25,000 years ago) which cut the connection. The elevation of the mountains west of the lake (which is currently the Kahuzi-Biega National Park, one of the largest reserves of eastern lowland (or Grauer's) gorillas in the world), combined with the elevation of the eastern rift (located in eastern Rwanda) would be responsible for the drainage of water from central Rwanda in the actual Lake Kivu. This concept of "proto-lake Kivu" was challenged by lack of consistent geological evidence, although the cichlid's molecular clock suggests the existence of a lake much older than the commonly cited 15,000 years.

Lake Kivu is the home of four species of freshwater crab, including two non-endemics (Potamonautes lirrangensis and P. mutandensis) and two endemics (P. bourgaultae and P. idjwiensis). Among Rift Valley lakes, Lake Tanganyika and Lake Victoria are the only other with endemic freshwater crabs.

Illegal fishing
In 2018, over 400 cases of potential illegal fishing were recorded on Kivu Lake and due to illegal fishing practices based on use of destructive equipment, the fish production in Kivu Lake dropped from 24 199 tones in 2017 to 16 194 tones in 2020 it is the high rate of 28% Rwanda Agriculture and Animal Resources Development Board said. Between May and July 2020, Rwanda Police Marine Unit operations reported 27 cases including 10 arrested poachers for illegal fishing on the lake.

See also
Limnic eruption
Mazuku
Meromictic lake

References

 
African Great Lakes
Lakes of the Great Rift Valley
Lakes of the Democratic Republic of the Congo
Lakes of Rwanda
Meromictic lakes
Democratic Republic of the Congo–Rwanda border
International lakes of Africa
Limnically active lakes